"Moments and Mine (Despite Straight Lines)" is a single by the Irish post-punk band Virgin Prunes, released as a vinyl 7" on 27 June 1981 by Rough Trade Records.

Formats and track listing 
All songs written by the Virgin Prunes

UK 7" single (RT 072)
"Moments and Mine (Despite Straight Lines)" – 4:27
"In the Greylight" – 2:50
"War" – 2:06

Personnel 
Drums Haa-Lacka Binttii (Daniel Figgis)
Boy on the cover is Binttii's (Daniel Figgis) younger brother, Jonny Figgis
Virgin Prunes
 Binttii – drums
 Dik Evans – guitar
 Gavin Friday – vocals
 Guggi – vocals
 Strongman – bass guitar

Technical personnel
 Adam Kidron – engineering
 George Peckham – mastering
 Geoff Travis – production
 Virgin Prunes – production

Charts

References 

1981 songs
1981 singles
Rough Trade Records singles
Virgin Prunes songs